The FIA European Touring Car Cup was an annual touring car racing event, which had been held at various locations across Europe from 2005 to 2017. Unlike in previous years where it was a one-off event, in 2010 the series was a three-round event.

History
It was created when the European Touring Car Championship finished at the end of 2004, being superseded by the World Touring Car Championship.

The cars that are eligible are those complying with the FIA Super 2000, Super 2000 Diesel, Super Production and Super 1600 technical regulations. The drivers must either have competed in a minimum of 50% of their own National Championships; been designated by their ASN (National Sporting Authority) and who have not taken part in the FIA WTCC with a Manufacturer's team  or belong to a country in which there is no national Championship and been designated by their ASN.
In 2012 the Single Make Trophy was introduced for cars such as SEAT León Supercopa and Renault Clio Cup. From the 2013 season Diesel engines and the Super Production regulations were outlawed and thus only petrol engined Super 2000 (in 2014 the older 1.6 turbocharged Super 2000 spec cars were also allowed), SEAT León Supercopa (replaced in 2015 by the new SEAT León Cup Racer) and Super 1600 cars are allowed.

Further changes were made in 2015 (with effect from the 2016 season) - the Single Make Trophy (renamed TCN-2) and Super 2000 (TC2 & TC2T) classes were merged into single category, while Super 1600 was retained as a standalone category. In January 2016 it was revealed the new branding of the series with the introduction of new logo similar to the styling of recent FIA series such as FIA World Endurance Championship. For the 2017 season the unified Super 2000 (TCN-2/TCR, TC2 and TC2-T) was renamed ETCC-1 while the Super 1600 cars were renamed ETCC-2.

The event was organised by Eurosport Events, which has also organised the World Touring Car Championship and European Rally Championship. The races were occasionally broadcast live or via 30 minute highlights on Eurosport.

Event format
 Saturday: two 30-minute practice sessions; one 30-minute qualifying session
 Sunday: one 15-minute warm-up session; two back-to-back 50 km races
 The grid of Race 2 is determined by Race 1 results, with top-8 in reverse order

In 2010 the event format will change from a one-off event to four separate events over the year.

Point scoring system
In each class - Super 2000 and Super 1600 points are awarded in each of the two races in the following way:
1st 10 points; 2nd 8 points; 3rd 6 points; 4th 5 points; 5th 4 points; 6th 3 points; 7th 2 points; 8th 1 point

Titles
The points scored count towards the following trophies (as of 2016):
 FIA Drivers’ European Touring Car Cup Super 2000
 FIA Drivers’ European Touring Car Cup Super 1600

Champions

Event winners

European Touring Car Cup

See also
List of European Touring Car Cup drivers

References

External links
Official Website of the FIA EUROPEAN TOURING CAR CUP